E611 can refer to:
 E 611 road (United Arab Emirates)
 European route E611, a route in France part of the international E-road network